The Confessor may refer to:

The Confessor (album), a 1985 album by Joe Walsh
"The Confessor" (song), a 1985 song by Joe Walsh
The Confessor (film), a 2004 film
The Confessor (novel), a 2003 novel by Daniel Silva

See also 
Confessor (disambiguation)
List of Confessors, a list of people with the Christian title Confessor of the Faith